The Bulldogs Rugby League Football Club, an Australian rugby league team, have had a number of team songs throughout their history.

We're Bulldogs 
The current Bulldogs team song is "We're Bulldogs". A similar track was penned by the club in 2006, but it has not become widely accepted as a new club song. Despite the official status of "We're Bulldogs" as team song, it is not generally played at Bulldogs home matches when the players enter the field: instead, "Who Let the Dogs Out?" by Baha Men is used.

We are the Mighty Bulldogs 
"We are the Mighty Bulldogs" was the club's 1980s-era team song. It is set to the tune of the Marines' Hymn.

Canterbury is the Greatest 
Before the adoption of the Bulldogs name in 1978, the club was simply known as Canterbury-Bankstown or Canterbury. In the 1970s, "Canterbury is the Greatest" was the team song.

References

External links

Team Song
Football songs and chants